Robert Magnusson from the University of Texas at Arlington, TX was named Fellow of the Institute of Electrical and Electronics Engineers (IEEE) in 2014 for contributions to the invention of a new class of nanophotonic devices.

References

External links
IEEE Explore Bio

Fellow Members of the IEEE
Living people
Year of birth missing (living people)
Place of birth missing (living people)
University of Texas at Arlington faculty
American electrical engineers